Althea Henley (July 23, 1911 – April 25, 1996) was an American film actress and dancer. She appeared in approximately 15 films between 1930 and 1936.

Career
Born in Egypt, Pennsylvania in 1911, Henley was the second of four children. She was trained as a dancer while growing up near Allentown, Pennsylvania, and eventually moved to New York City to appear in vaudeville. While in New York, Henley performed in Florenz Ziegfeld's "Show Girl".

Henley moved to Hollywood and appeared in several films for Fox Film Corporation and Columbia Pictures. Her roles were restricted to those of a showgirl or other romantic interests. Modern viewers will remember her as a sound stage girl from the Three Stooges film Movie Maniacs, where she was Larry's kissing partner. She also appeared with the comedy team in the films Three Little Beers and Ants in the Pantry. Henley also had bit parts in such films as Mr. Deeds Goes to Town and George White's Scandals. She may be best known for her role in Up the River.

Personal life
Henley was married several times. Her first marriage was in April 1934, in which she eloped with radio personality Hugh Ernst. They divorced shortly thereafter. Her second marriage was to British automobile businessman Arthur Markham in April 1938, and they later relocated to London. Her final marriage was to William J. Begg, vice president of the Michael J Hamilburg agency in Hollywood. The family retired to Bermuda in the 1960s.

Henley died in her home in Smith's Parish, Bermuda in 1996.

Selected filmography
 The Kid from Spain (1932)
 The Phantom Broadcast (1933)
 Find the Lady (1936)

References

External links

1911 births
1996 deaths
American film actresses
Actresses from Pennsylvania
People from Lehigh County, Pennsylvania
20th-century American actresses